Satyavati Dang was an Indian politician and member of the Indian National Congress. She was a member of the Rajya Sabha from 1968 to 1974 when Himachal Pradesh became state. Dang was the president of the Himachal Pradesh Congress Committee from 1964 to 1969 

She was second wife of first Chief Minister of Himachal Pradesh Dr. Yashwant Singh Parmar. She died on 25 February 2010 at Indira Gandhi Medical College in Shimla after prolonged illness.

References 

Indian National Congress politicians from Himachal Pradesh
Rajya Sabha members from Himachal Pradesh
2010 deaths
Women in Himachal Pradesh politics
Women members of the Rajya Sabha
Date of birth missing